This article contains information about the literary events and publications of 2004.

Events
January
The poet Jang Jin-sung, in trouble with the North Korean authorities, defects to South Korea.
The Richard & Judy Book Club is launched on UK daytime television.
February – Canada Reads selects Guy Vanderhaeghe's The Last Crossing to be read across the nation.
February 16 – Edwin Morgan becomes Scotland's first official national poet, the Scots Makar, appointed by the Scottish Parliament.
May 23 – Seattle Central Library, designed by Rem Koolhaas, opens to the public.
June 1 – Controversy surrounds Battle Royale by Koushun Takami (高見広春), when an 11-year-old fan of the story in Sasebo, Nagasaki, murders her classmate, 12-year-old Satomi Mitarai, in a way that mimics a scene from the story.
October 14 – Edinburgh becomes UNESCO's first City of Literature.
October 31 – Denoël in Paris publishes Irène Némirovsky's Suite française, consisting of two novellas, Tempête en juin and Dolce, written and set in 1940–1941, from a sequence left unfinished on the author's death in Auschwitz concentration camp in 1942.
December 18 – The première of Gurpreet Kaur Bhatti's play Behzti (Dishonour) at England's Birmingham Repertory Theatre is cancelled after violent protests by members of the Sikh community.
unknown dates
Kansas City Public Library's Community Bookshelf is built.
The typeface Calibri, designed by Luc(as) de Groot, is introduced.

New books

Fiction
Cecelia Ahern – PS, I Love You
C. C. Allentini – Dead of Winter
Germano Almeida – O mar na Lajinha
John Ames – Wake Up Sir!
R. Scott Bakker – The Darkness That Comes Before
Blue Balliett – Chasing Vermeer
Iain M. Banks – The Algebraist
Steven Barnes – The Cestus Deception
Alistair Beaton – A Planet for the President
Thomas Berger – Adventures of the Artificial Woman
Louis de Bernières – Birds Without Wings
Roberto Bolaño (posthumous) – 2666
Xurxo Borrazás – Ser ou non
T. C. Boyle – The Inner Circle
Anthony Cartwright – The Afterglow
Gennifer Choldenko – Al Capone Does My Shirts
Kate Christensen – The Epicure's Lament: A Novel
Stephen Clarke – A Year in the Merde
Susanna Clarke – Jonathan Strange and Mr Norrell
Wendy Coakley-Thompson – Back to Life
Allison Hedge Coke – Rock, Ghost, Willow, Deer
Suzanne Collins – Gregor the Overlander
J. J. Connolly – Layer Cake
Afua Cooper – The Hanging of Angelique
Bernard Cornwell
Sharpe's Escape
The Last Kingdom
Douglas Coupland – Eleanor Rigby
Stevie Davies – Kith & Kin
L. Sprague de Camp, Lin Carter and Björn Nyberg – Sagas of Conan
Michel Déon – Your Father's Room
Cory Doctorow – Eastern Standard Tribe
Ben Elton – Past Mortem
Gustav Ernst – Grado. Süße Nacht
Giorgio Faletti – Niente di vero tranne gli occhi
Karen Joy Fowler – The Jane Austen Book Club
Ge Fei (格非) – 人面桃花 (Renmian Taohua, Peach Blossom Beauty)
Robert Goddard – Play to the End
Adrien Goetz – La Dormeuse de Naples
Helon Habila – Waiting for an Angel
Margaret Peterson Haddix – Among the Brave
Elisabeth Harvor, All Times Have Been Modern (Canada)
Michael Helm – In the Place of Last Things
Carl Hiaasen – Skinny Dip
Alan Hollinghurst – The Line of Beauty
Jiang Rong – Wolf Totem
Cynthia Kadohata – Kira-Kira
Mitsuyo Kakuta (角田 光代) – Woman on the Other Shore
Peg Kehret – Escaping the Giant Wave
Thomas Keneally – The Tyrant's Novel
Stephen King
The Dark Tower VI: Song of Susannah
The Dark Tower VII: The Dark Tower 
John Kiriamiti – My Life in Prison
Karl Ove Knausgård – A Time to Every Purpose Under Heaven (En tid for alt)
László Krasznahorkai – Destruction and Sorrow Beneath the Heavens (Rombolás és bánat az Ég alatt)
Thor Kunkel – Endstufe
David Leavitt – The Body of Jonah Boyd
Tanith Lee – Piratica
David Lodge – Author, Author
Andreï Makine – The Woman Who Waited (La femme qui attendait)
Henning Mankell – Depths
David Michaels – Tom Clancy's Splinter Cell
David Mitchell – Cloud Atlas
Aka Morchiladze – Santa Esperanza
Bharati Mukherjee – The Tree Bride
Alice Munro – Runaway
V. S. Naipaul – Magic Seeds
Ngũgĩ wa Thiong'o – Mũrogi wa Kagogo (Wizard of the Crow)
Garth Nix – Grim Tuesday
Cees Nooteboom – Lost Paradise (Paradijs verloren)
Daniel Olivas – Devil Talk: Stories
Linda Sue Park – When My Name Was Keoko
Jodi Picoult – My Sister's Keeper
Terry Pratchett
A Hat Full of Sky
Going Postal
Michael Reaves and Steve Perry – MedStar I: Battle Surgeons and MedStar II: Jedi Healer
Marilynne Robinson – Gilead
Philip Roth – The Plot Against America
Edward Rutherfurd – Dublin: Foundation
Nick Sagan – Edenborn
David Sherman and Dan Cragg – Jedi Trial
Kyle Smith – Love Monkey
David Southwell – Conspiracy Files
Muriel Spark – The Finishing School
Olen Steinhauer – The Confession
Neal Stephenson
The Confusion (Vol. II of the Baroque Cycle)
The System of the World (Vol. III of the Baroque Cycle)
Sean Stewart – Yoda: Dark Rendezvous
Thomas Sullivan – Dust of Eden
Michel Thaler – Le Train de Nulle Part
Colm Tóibín – The Master
Zlatko Topčić – Bare Skin
Karen Traviss – Star Wars Republic Commando: Hard Contact
Jonathan Trigell – Boy A
Andrew Vachss – Down Here
Vivian Vande Velde – Heir Apparent
Bob Weltlich – Crooked Zebra
A. N. Wilson – My Name Is Legion
Michael Winter – The Big Why
Carlos Ruiz Zafon – The Shadow of the Wind
Juli Zeh – Gaming Instinct
Florian Zeller – La Fascination du pire (The Fascination of Evil)

Children and young people
David Almond – Kate, the Cat and the Moon
Mary Bartek – Funerals and Fly Fishing
John Fardell – The Seven Professors of the Far North
Mem Fox – Where Is the Green Sheep?
Cornelia Funke – When Santa Fell to Earth
Virginia Hamilton (with Barry Moser) – Wee Winnie Witch's Skinny: An Original African American Scare Tale
J. Patrick Lewis (with Gary Kelley) – The Stolen Smile
Robert Muchamore – The Recruit (first in the CHERUB series)
Jenny Nimmo – Charlie Bone and the Blue Boa
Liz Pichon – My Big Brother, Boris
Carlos Cuauhtémoc Sánchez – The Eyes of My Princess
Lemony Snicket – The Grim Grotto
Dugald Steer (with Nghiem Ta, etc.) – Egyptology: Search for the Tomb of Osiris

Drama
Alan Bennett – The History Boys
Gurpreet Kaur Bhatti – Behzti
Neil Brand – Stan (radio)
Bryony Lavery – Frozen
Brent Hartinger – Geography Club
Louis Nowra – The Woman with Dog's Eyes
John Patrick Shanley – Doubt
Florian Zeller – L'Autre (The Other)

Poetry

Seamus Heaney – Beacons at Bealtaine

Non-fiction
Steve Almond – Candyfreak
Thomas P.M. Barnett – The Pentagon's New Map
Ingmar and Ingrid Bergman and Maria von Rosen – Tre dagböcker (Three diaries)
T. Mike Childs – The Rocklopedia Fakebandica
Richard A. Clarke – Against All Enemies: Inside America's War on Terror
Jonathan Coe – Like A Fiery Elephant: The Story of B. S. Johnson
Allison Hedge Coke – Rock, Ghost, Willow, Deer
Anne Coleman – I'll Tell You a Secret
Flora Fraser – Princesses: The Six Daughters of George III
Leonie Frieda – Catherine de' Medici
Sheila Hancock – The Two of Us: My Life with John Thaw
Gareth Stedman Jones – An End to Poverty?
Pedro Lemebel – Adiós mariquita linda
Doris Lessing – Time Bites: Views and Reviews
Lawrence Lessig – Free Culture
Mario Vargas Llosa – The Temptation of the Impossible
Roger Lowenstein – Origins of the Crash
Hugh Masekela – Still Grazing (autobiography)
Predrag Miletić – Biciklom do Hilandara
Farah Pahlavi – An Enduring Love: My Life with the Shah
Chuck Palahniuk – Stranger Than Fiction: True Stories
Michael Palin – Himalaya
Sethy Regenvanu – Laef blong mi (From village to nation: an autobiography)
Anita Roddick – Take it Personally: How globalization affects you and powerful ways to challenge it
Miranda Seymour – The Bugatti Queen: In Search of a Motor-Racing Legend
Owen Sheers – The Dust Diaries
Rebecca Solnit – Hope in the Dark
Ben Stein – Can America Survive? The Rage of the Left, The Truth, and What to Do About It
Jon Stewart and writers of The Daily Show – America (The Book): A Citizen's Guide to Democracy Inaction
Milt Thomas – Cave of a Thousand Tales
J. Maarten Troost – The Sex Lives of Cannibals
United Kingdom Government – Delivering Security in a Changing World
Francis Wheen – How Mumbo-Jumbo Conquered the World (also Idiot Proof: A Short History of Modern Delusions)
Alford A. Young Jr. – The Minds of Marginalized Black Men

Deaths
January 3 – Lillian Beckwith, English novelist (born 1916)
January 4
Joan Aiken, English novelist and children's writer (born 1924)
Jeff Nuttall, English poet, artist and activist (born 1933)
John Toland, American author and historian (born 1912) 
January 10
Alexandra Ripley, American novelist (born 1934)
(or January 11) Spalding Gray, American writer and actor (born 1942)
January 13 – Zeno Vendler, American philosopher and linguist (born 1921)
January 14 – Jack Cady, American fantasy and horror novelist (born 1932)
January 15
Alex Barris, Canadian actor and writer (born 1922)
Olivia Goldsmith, American novelist (complications from cosmetic surgery, born 1949)
January 24 – Abdul Rahman Munif, Arab writer (born 1933)
January 29
Janet Frame, New Zealand novelist, poet and short story writer (born 1924)
M. M. Kaye, Indian-born English novelist (born 1908)
February 2 – Alan Bullock, English historian (born 1914)
February 4 – Hilda Hilst, Brazilian poet, playwright and novelist (born 1930)
February 5 – Frances Partridge, English diarist (born 1900)
February 7 – Norman Thelwell, English cartoonist (born 1923)
February 17 – Bruce Beaver, Australian poet and novelist (born 1928)
February 27 – Paul Sweezy, American economist and editor (born 1910)
February 28 – Daniel J. Boorstin, American historian (born 1914)
February 29 – Jerome Lawrence, American playwright (born 1915)
March 9 – Albert Mol, Dutch author, actor and dancer (born 1917)
March 27 – Robert Merle, French novelist (born 1908)
March 29 – Peter Ustinov, English actor, dramatist and memoirist (born 1921) 
March 30
Alistair Cooke, English-born American journalist and broadcaster (born 1908)
Dr Michael King OBE, New Zealand historian, author and biographer (born 1945)
April 19
Norris McWhirter, English writer and activist (born 1925)
John Maynard Smith, English evolutionary biologist and writer (born 1920)
April 25 – Thom Gunn, English poet (born 1929)
April 26 – Hubert Selby, Jr., American author (born 1928)
May 2 – Paul Guimard, French writer (born 1921)
May 12
Syd Hoff, American author and illustrator (born 1912)
Alexander Skutch, American scientific writer and naturalist (born 1904)
May 31 – Lionel Abrahams, South African novelist, poet and essayist (born 1928)
July 1 – Peter Barnes, English playwright (born 1931)
July 8 – Paula Danziger, American children's and young adult novelist (born 1945)
August 8 – Farida Diouri, Moroccan novelist (born 1953)
August 12 – Humayun Azad, Bangladeshi author, poet, scholar and linguist (born 1947)
August 14 – Czesław Miłosz, Polish writer and Nobel laureate (born 1911)
August 30 – Mario Levrero, Uruguayan novelist (born 1940)
September 18 – Norman Cantor, Canadian historian (born 1929)
September 24 – Françoise Sagan, French novelist (born 1935)
September 28 – Mulk Raj Anand, Indian novelist in English (born 1905)
October – Natalya Baranskaya, Russian short-story writer (born 1908)
October 8 – Jacques Derrida, Algerian-born French literary critic (born 1930)
October 13 – Bernice Rubens, Welsh-born novelist (born 1928)
October 16
Vincent Brome, English biographer and novelist (born 1910)
Harold Perkin, English social historian (born 1926)
October 20 – Anthony Hecht, American poet (born 1923)
November 9 – Stieg Larsson, Swedish journalist and crime novelist (heart attack, born 1954)
November 24 – Arthur Hailey, Canadian novelist (born 1920)
December 2 – Mona Van Duyn, American poet (born 1921)
December 8 – Jackson Mac Low, American poet (born 1922)
December 12 – Phaswane Mpe, South African novelist (born 1970)
December 13 – Jón frá Pálmholti (Jón Kjartansson), Icelandic writer and journalist (born 1930)
December 18 – Anthony Sampson, British journalist and biographer (born 1926)
December 28 – Susan Sontag, American novelist (born 1933)

Awards
Nobel Prize for Literature: Elfriede Jelinek
Camões Prize: Agustina Bessa-Luís

Australia
The Australian/Vogel Literary Award: Julienne van Loon, Road Story
Victorian Premier's Literary Award C. J. Dennis Prize for Poetry: Judith Beveridge, Wolf Notes
Kenneth Slessor Prize for Poetry: Pam Brown, Dear Deliria: New & Selected Poems
Mary Gilmore Prize: David McCooey, Blister Pack; Michael Brennan, Imageless World
Miles Franklin Award: Shirley Hazzard, The Great Fire
Victorian Premier's Literary Award Vance Palmer Prize for Fiction: Annamarie Jagose, Slow Water

Canada
Giller Prize: Alice Munro, Runaway
Governor General's Awards: See 2004 Governor General's Awards
Griffin Poetry Prize: Anne Simpson, Loop and August Kleinzahler, The Strange Hours Travelers Keep
Edna Staebler Award for Creative Non-Fiction: Andrea Curtis, Into the Blue

Sweden

Astrid Lindgren Memorial Award: Lygia Bojunga Nunes

United Kingdom
Caine Prize for African Writing: Brian Chikwava, "Seventh Street Alchemy"
Carnegie Medal for children's literature: Frank Cottrell Boyce, Millions
Cholmondeley Award: John Agard, Ruth Padel Lawrence Sail, Eva Salzman
Eric Gregory Award: Nick Laird, Elizabeth Manuel, Abi Curtis, Sophie Levy, Saradha Soobrayen
James Tait Black Memorial Prize for biography: Jonathan Bate, John Clare: A Biography
James Tait Black Memorial Prize for fiction: David Peace, GB84
Man Booker Prize: Alan Hollinghurst, The Line of Beauty
Orange Prize for Fiction: Andrea Levy, Small Island
Queen's Gold Medal for Poetry: Hugo Williams
Whitbread Best Book Award: Andrea Levy, Small Island

United States
Aiken Taylor Award for Modern American Poetry: Henry Taylor
Agnes Lynch Starrett Poetry Prize: Aaron Smith, Blue on Blue Ground
Bernard F. Connors Prize for Poetry: Jeremy Glazier, "Conversations with the Sidereal Messenger"
Bobbitt National Prize for Poetry: B.H. Fairchild, Early Occult Memory Systems of the Lower Midwest
Brittingham Prize in Poetry: John Brehm, Sea of Faith
Compton Crook Award: E. E. Knight, Way of the Wolf
Frost Medal: Richard Howard
Hugo Award for Best Novel: Lois McMaster Bujold, Paladin of Souls
Lambda Literary Awards: Multiple categories; see 2004 Lambda Literary Awards.
National Book Award for Fiction: to The News from Paraguay by Lily Tuck
National Book Critics Circle Award: to Gilead by Marilynne Robinson
PEN/Faulkner Award for Fiction: to The Early Stories: 1953–1975 by John Updike
Wallace Stevens Award: Mark Strand
Whiting Awards:
Fiction: Daniel Alarcón, Kirsten Bakis, Victor LaValle
Nonfiction: Allison Glock, John Jeremiah Sullivan
Plays: Elana Greenfield, Tracey Scott Wilson
Poetry: Catherine Barnett, Dan Chiasson, A. Van Jordan

Elsewhere
Premio Nadal: Antonio Soler, El camino de los ingleses

See also
List of years in literature
Literature
Poetry
List of literary awards
List of poetry awards
The Best American Short Stories 2004
2004 in Australian literature

Notes

References

 
Literature
Years of the 21st century in literature